The Delhi state assembly elections 1998, which were held on 25 November 1998 and result declare on 28 November 1998 for Legislative Assembly of Delhi, led to the formation of government by Indian National Congress.

Result

Elected members

See also
 1998 elections in India
 List of constituencies of the Delhi Legislative Assembly
 First Legislative Assembly of Delhi
 Second Legislative Assembly of Delhi
 Third Legislative Assembly of Delhi
 Fourth Legislative Assembly of Delhi
 Fifth Legislative Assembly of Delhi
 Sixth Legislative Assembly of Delhi

References

External links
Legislative Assembly of Delhi, Official website

1998
Delhi
1990s in Delhi